Jonathan or Jon Morgan may refer to:

Jonathan Morgan (director) (born 1966), director and former actor in pornographic films
Jonathan Morgan (politician) (born 1974), Welsh Conservative politician
Jonathan Morgan (footballer), English football coach and former player
Jon Morgan (footballer), Welsh footballer
Jon Morgan (New Hampshire politician), member of the New Hampshire Senate